Gurdeep Kaur Kohli, also known as Gurdeep Punj is an Indian actress. She is known for her television roles as Hemani Singh in Best of Luck Nikki, Dr. Juhi in Sanjivani, and Bani in Kasamh Se.

Early life 
Gurdeep Kaur Kohli is of Punjabi descent. She was born in Mumbai, Maharashtra into a Sikh family. After years of working on television and as a model, Gurdip married Arjun Punj on 10 December 2006, her co-star from Sanjivani.

Career

Television 
Gurdip started her career as a model for advertisements on Indian television. She then appeared in Falguni Pathak's music video "Haire Mere Hui Gulabi". The most important role in her career was Dr. Juhi Singh on Sanjivani which earned her accolades. She later worked in Zee TV's Sinndoor Tere Naam Ka. She was part of STAR One's Jet Set Go and Nach Baliye 2 with her husband Arjun Punj. Later on she appeared in Kasamh Se as Pronita Walia  Mitra née, who later turns out to be Bani Jai Walia. She was seen in Best Of Luck Nikki as Hemani Singh. She is hosting her own cooking program named Bacha Party and ABC (All 'Bout Cooking) on Zee Khana Khazana. She played a negative role in Diya Aur Baati Hum and in Dil Ki Baatein Dil Hi Jaane. She played the role of "Sethji" Ahilya Devi in the Zee TV show Sethji. She acted in Kehne Ko Humsafar Hain, on ALTBalaji, along with Ronit Roy and Mona Singh. She portrayed Jodha Bai in Colors TV's Dastaan-E-Mohabbat: Salim Anarkali. She again portrayed Dr. Juhi Singh in Sanjivani 2 which premiered on 12 August 2019.

Film 
Gurdip debuted in the 2012 Bollywood film Rowdy Rathore, which was directed by Prabhu Deva. She also appeared in the 2019 film Student of the Year 2, as Anamika Bani.

Filmography

Television

Films

References

External links 

Female models from Mumbai
Indian television actresses
Indian women television presenters
Indian television presenters
Living people
Year of birth missing (living people)
Punjabi people
Indian Sikhs
People from Mumbai
Indian soap opera actresses
21st-century Indian actresses
Actresses in Hindi cinema
Indian film actresses
Actresses in Hindi television